Friedrichskoog is a municipality in the district of Dithmarschen, in Schleswig-Holstein, Germany. It is situated near the outflow of the Elbe into the North Sea, approximately 25 km southwest of Heide, and 25 km northeast of Cuxhaven.

The municipality is located in and named after the polder, which was named in honour of King Frederick VII of Denmark.

References

Dithmarschen
Koogs